Mehammarsåta or Midhamarsåta is the highest mountain on the island of Stord in the municipality of Stord in Vestland county, Norway.

See also
List of mountains of Norway

References

Stord
Mountains of Vestland